Fanconi anemia group J protein is a protein that in humans is encoded by the BRCA1-interacting protein 1 (BRIP1) gene.

Function 

The protein encoded by this gene is a member of the RecQ DEAH helicase family and interacts with the BRCT repeats of breast cancer, type 1 (BRCA1). The bound complex is important in the normal double-strand break repair function of breast cancer, type 1 (BRCA1). This gene may be a target of germline cancer-inducing mutations.

This protein also appears to be important in ovarian cancer where it seems to act as a tumor suppressor. Mutations in BRIP1 are associated with a 10-15% risk of ovarian cancer.

BRIP1 appears to have an important role in neuronal cells by suppressing oxidative stress, excitotoxicity induced DNA damage, and in protecting the integrity of mitochondria.  A deficiency of BRIP1 causes increased DNA damage, mitochondrial abnormalities and neuronal cell death.

DNA repair

BRIP1 protein is a DNA helicase that is employed in homologous recombinational repair, and in the response of the cell to DNA replication stress. In part, BRIP1 carries out its function through interaction with other key DNA repair proteins, specifically MLH1, BRCA1 and BLM.  This group of proteins helps to ensuring genome stability, and in particular repairs DNA double-strand breaks during prophase 1 of meiosis.

Interactions 

BRIP1 has been shown to interact with BRCA1.

References

Further reading

External links

Human proteins

External links 
 
 

Human proteins